Glauk Konjufca (born 25 July 1981) is a Kosovar Albanian activist, journalist and politician serving as chairman of the Assembly of Kosovo since 22 March 2021. He was previously member of the Assembly, leader of the Vetëvendosje parliamentary group, chairman of the Assembly, minister of Foreign Affairs, as well as acting president of Kosovo until the election of Vjosa Osmani.

Early life and education 
Konjufca was born in Prishtina. He studied philosophy at the University of Prishtina. During his studies, he served as deputy director of the Center for Rights student organization.

Konjufca is the author of a book on G.W.F. Hegel and other publications on philosophy.

Politics 
Konjufca has been an activist of the Vetëvendosje Movement since its founding in 2005. He edited the movement's weekly newspaper, and was elected to the Assembly of Kosovo in 2010, when Vetëvendosje first ran for elected office. He served as deputy chairman of the Assembly from 2011 to 2014 and again from 2015 to 2017, and led the Vetëvendosje parliamentary group from 2014 to 2019.

After Vetëvendosje's victory in the 2019 parliamentary election, Konjufca was appointed chairman of the Assembly on 26 December 2019 with a 75–27 vote. He resigned on 3 February 2020 to become minister of foreign affairs. He left office when a new government led by opposition parties took over on 3 June 2020.

Konjufca was the second most voted candidate in the 2021 parliamentary election, which Vetëvendosje won by a landslide. On 22 March 2021, he was elected chairman of the Assembly by a 69–33 vote. With a vacant presidency, Konjufca was also serving as acting president until the election of Vjosa Osmani.

References 

|-

|-

Albanian politicians
Kosovo Albanians
Writers from Pristina
1981 births
Living people
Chairmen of the Assembly of the Republic of Kosovo
Politicians from Pristina
Vetëvendosje politicians
University of Pristina alumni
Foreign ministers of Kosovo